The United Asian Debating Championship (UADC) is an annual debating tournament for teams from universities in Asia. It is the largest inter-varsity Parliamentary Debate tournament in Asia, with over 600 participants. The UADC holds debates in the Asian 3-on-3 format Parliamentary Debating. The 1st UADC was hosted by Assumption University, Bangkok in 2010.

The UADC was created after a decision to merge the two separate championships that were held after the Asian Debating community split in 2005 - the Asian Universities Debating Championship (AUDC) and the All-Asian Intervarsity Debating Championships (AIDC or "All-Asians"). The decision to unite the two competing tournaments, and thus, create a single debate championship for Asia was taken at the last Asian Universities Debating Championships in 2009.

Origin

Arising out of a unification of the Asian Universities Debating Championship as well as the All-Asian Intervarsity Debating Championships, UADC represents the results of efforts to bridge the schism that emerged in Asian debating.

Institutions who were unhappy about aspects of the organisation of the All-Asian Intervarsity Debating Championships established the Asian Universities Debating Championship in 2005 as an alternative to the All-Asians Championship. Since then, many universities in Asia with strong debating traditions – most notably universities from the Philippines and Singapore, including all except one of the institutions who won the All-Asian championships up to 2004 – had chosen not to participate in the All-Asian Intervarsity Championships and have instead entered teams in the Asian Universities Debating Championship.

While not necessarily intended to be a rival tournament, the last three AUDCs coincided with the schedule of the All-Asian Championship, which made it impractical for teams to attend both tournaments.

After many overtures, including a proposal to have an Asian Unity Tournament in Multimedia University, Malaysia, which was not accepted by the AUDC Council, it was agreed that the All-Asian Universities would attend the AUDC Championships held in 2009 in Dhaka hosted by East West University. It was decided here in Council that the two tournaments would unite in the next edition, and the name of this new tournament would be the United Asian Debating Championships.

The Union

The Union that decided the unification was chaired by Estelle Osorio from De La Salle University. The next chair, Vikram Balasubramanian of Nanyang Technological University of Singapore, was elected in the same union meeting.

The 1st United Asians Debate Championship was hosted by Assumption University, Thailand. Dino de Leon of De La Salle University chaired the Union meetings as acting chair. Sharmila Parmanand of Ateneo de Manila University was elected as the chair for year 2010–2011.

Format of the event

The UADC, like the AUDC and the All-Asians, is held annually in May, but was later transferred in June due to the academic calendar change. The competition involves eight preliminary rounds, which become power-paired as the tournament progresses, matching the strongest-performing teams against each other.

The preliminary rounds are followed by a "break" announcement, at which the teams proceeding to elimination rounds are announced. Separate breaks are announced for English as Foreign language (EFL) team competition. 16 teams proceed to octo-finals. While preliminary rounds are usually judged by up to three judges, break rounds are judged by panels of five or seven, and the finals by a panel of nine.

Due to the COVID-19 outbreak the 2020 edition of UADC was the first ever Digital UADC, it was hosted by the Bangladesh Debating Council with the support of Independent University Bangladesh & Institute of Business Administration, University of Dhaka

Past tournaments

Best Speakers of the Tournament

Future tournaments

 2020 – Online from Bangladesh

References

External links

All UADC motions here

Asian debating competitions